Jaylen Tairique Adams (born May 4, 1996) is an American professional basketball player for the Qingdao Eagles of the Chinese Basketball Association (CBA). He played college basketball for the St. Bonaventure Bonnies, earning co-Atlantic 10 Conference Player of the Year honors as a senior in 2018.

High school and college career
Adams played high school ball for Mount St. Joseph where he was a three-time MIAA A Conference champion. He committed to play in college for St. Bonaventure, averaging 17.9 points, 5.0 assists and 3.7 rebounds per game as a sophomore and was named a first-team All-Atlantic 10 player. In his junior season, Adams finished second in the Atlantic 10 Conference in scoring (20.6 points per game), first in assists (6.5 per game) and second in steals (2.1 per game). He was named to the First Team All-Atlantic 10 for the second straight year.

Adams missed the first six games of his senior season. In February 2018, Adams scored 40- and 44-point games against Duquesne and St. Louis. As a senior, Adams was the fourth leading scorer in the Atlantic 10 with 19.1  points per game to go with 5.2 assists per game. He led St. Bonaventure to a 26–8 record and upset of UCLA in the NCAA Tournament. He was named conference co-Player of the Year with Peyton Aldridge. After the season, Adams was invited to the Reese's College All-Star Game but missed it with an ankle injury and instead played in the Portsmouth Invitational Tournament.

Professional career

Atlanta Hawks (2018–2019)
After going undrafted in the 2018 NBA draft, Adams was signed by the Atlanta Hawks to a two-way contract. Under the terms of the deal he will split time between the Hawks and their NBA G League affiliate, the Erie BayHawks. Adams made his NBA debut on October 17, 2018, recording 1 rebound and 1 assist in 4 minutes of action in a blowout 127–106 loss to the New York Knicks. He scored 23 points in his G League debut in a win over the Grand Rapids Drive. On February 20, 2019, the Atlanta Hawks announced they had re-signed Adams to a multi-year contract. On July 13, 2019, Adams was waived by the Hawks.

Wisconsin Herd (2019–2020)
On August 20, 2019, Adams signed an Exhibit 10 contract with the Milwaukee Bucks. He was cut in training camp and assigned to the Bucks’ G League affiliate, the Wisconsin Herd. Adams scored a season-high 39 points including 6 3-pointers in a 122–115 win over the Grand Rapids Drive. On March 4, 2020, Adams dished out a career-high 14 assists to go along with his 19 points in a 106–108 loss to the Canton Charge. He averaged 21.5 points, 5.0 rebounds and 5.4 assists per game for the Herd.

Portland Trail Blazers (2020)
After the G League season, Adams was signed by the Portland Trail Blazers during the COVID-19 NBA restart to replace veteran forward Trevor Ariza, who opted out of returning to the NBA in Orlando due to child custody reasons. Adams missed several games with a lower back injury.

Milwaukee Bucks (2020–2021)
On November 24, 2020, the Milwaukee Bucks announced that they had signed Adams to two-way contract. On March 4, 2021, Adams was reported to have been waived by the Milwaukee Bucks after he appeared in seven games.

Sydney Kings (2021–2022)
On August 22, 2021, Adams signed with the Sydney Kings for the 2021–22 NBL season. He was named league MVP and helped lead the Kings to the NBL championship.

Crvena zvezda (2022)
On July 29, 2022, Adams signed with Crvena zvezda of the ABA League. He parted ways with the team on November 3, 2022.

Career statistics

NBA

Regular season

|-
| style="text-align:left;"| 
| style="text-align:left;"| Atlanta
| 34 || 1 || 12.6 || .345 || .338 || .778 || 1.8 || 1.9 || .4 || .1 || 3.2
|-
| style="text-align:left;"| 
| style="text-align:left;"| Milwaukee
| 7 || 0 || 2.6 || .125 || .000 || – || .4 || .3 || .0 || .0 || .3
|- class="sortbottom"
| style="text-align:center;" colspan="2"| Career
| 41 || 1 || 10.9 || .331 || .329 || .778 || 1.5 || 1.6 || .3 || .1 || 2.7

Playoffs

|-
| style="text-align:left;"| 2020
| style="text-align:left;"| Portland
| 3 || 0 || 7.0 || .333 || .000 || .000 || 1.0 || .7 || .3 || .0 || 2.0
|- class="sortbottom"
| style="text-align:center;" colspan="2"| Career
| 3 || 0 || 7.0 || .333 || .000 || .000 || 1.0 || .7 || .3 || .0 || 2.0

NBL

|-
| align="left" | 2021–22
| align="left" | Sydney
| 21 || 21 || 31.7 || .430 || .401 || .815 || 5.1 || 6.1 || 1.2 || .3 || 20.1
|- class="sortbottom"
| style="text-align:center;" colspan="2"| Career
| 21 || 21 || 31.7 || .430 || .401 || .815 || 5.1 || 6.1 || 1.2 || .3 || 20.1

College

|-
| style="text-align:left;"| 2014–15
| style="text-align:left;"| St. Bonaventure
| 22 || 22 || 32.5 || .386 || .324 || .783 || 2.5 || 4.5 || 1.1 || .0 || 10.0
|-
| style="text-align:left;"| 2015–16
| style="text-align:left;"| St. Bonaventure
| 30 || 30 || 37.5 || .445 || .438 || .874 || 3.7 || 5.0 || 1.3 || .3 || 17.9
|-
| style="text-align:left;"| 2016–17
| style="text-align:left;"| St. Bonaventure
| 30 || 29 || 37.4 || .419 || .356 || .821 || 3.7 || 6.5 || 2.1 || .2 || 20.6
|-
| style="text-align:left;"| 2017–18
| style="text-align:left;"| St. Bonaventure
| 28 || 27 || 37.0 || .437 || .436 || .851 || 3.4 || 5.2 || 1.5 || .3 || 19.1
|- class="sortbottom"
| style="text-align:center;" colspan="2"| Career
| 110 || 108 || 36.3 || .427 || .394 || .838 || 3.4 || 5.4 || 1.5 || .2 || 17.4

References

External links 

St. Bonaventure Bonnies bio

1996 births
Living people
21st-century African-American sportspeople
ABA League players
African-American basketball players
American expatriate basketball people in Australia
American expatriate basketball people in Serbia
American men's basketball players
Atlanta Hawks players
Basketball players from Baltimore
Erie BayHawks (2017–2019) players
KK Crvena zvezda players
Milwaukee Bucks players
Point guards
St. Bonaventure Bonnies men's basketball players
Sydney Kings players
Undrafted National Basketball Association players
Wisconsin Herd players